Henricus Antonius "Harry" Droog (born 17 December 1944) is a retired Dutch rower. He competed at the 1968 Summer Olympics and won a silver medal in the double sculls event, together with Leendert van Dis. In 1975 he won the Silver Goblets and Nickalls' Challenge Cup at the Henley Royal Regatta with Roel Luijnenburg.

References

1944 births
Living people
People from Beemster
Dutch male rowers
Olympic rowers of the Netherlands
Rowers at the 1968 Summer Olympics
Olympic silver medalists for the Netherlands
Delft University of Technology alumni
Olympic medalists in rowing
Medalists at the 1968 Summer Olympics
Sportspeople from North Holland